Pennsylvania Route 204 (PA 204), also known as Vine Street in the town of New Berlin, is a , north–south state highway located in Snyder and Union counties in Pennsylvania.  The southern terminus is at U.S. Route 522 (US 522) in Selinsgrove.  The northern terminus is at PA 304 in New Berlin.

Route description

PA 204 begins in the borough of Selinsgrove at the intersection of US 522, under a half a mile from the Penn Valley Airport.  The route goes north for about  before turning west in the village of Kratzerville, towards the Snyder-Union county line.

At the county line, PA 204 turns north into the borough of New Berlin, before terminating a short distance into the town at an intersection of PA 304.

History
PA 204 has stayed on the same roads since its inception.

Major intersections

See also

References

External links

Pennsylvania Highways: PA 204

204
Transportation in Snyder County, Pennsylvania
Transportation in Union County, Pennsylvania